"Asian Jake Paul" is a song by American YouTube personality iDubbbz featuring English YouTube personality and recording artist Boyinaband. The song was written by the two and was produced by Kustom Beats. It is a diss track aimed at fellow YouTube personality RiceGum, who was the subject of an episode of iDubbbz's viral "Content Cop" series. The single was released for digital download on October 3, 2017. It peaked at number 24 on the Billboard R&B/Hip-Hop Digital Song Sales chart.

Background and lyrics

On October 3, 2017, iDubbbz released an episode of the YouTube series Content Cop, titled "Content Cop – Jake Paul". While the title and thumbnail purportedly expressed that the video would be based on YouTube personality and former Disney actor Jake Paul, the video is actually about a YouTube personality Bryan Le, better known as RiceGum; iDubbbz specifically calls him "Asian Jake Paul", explaining that he didn't want to "give [RiceGum] the satisfaction of having his name in the title or his face in the thumbnail." In the 30-minute video, iDubbbz critiques RiceGum for many contentious comments and actions he had made in the past on his livestreams, and in videos that iDubbbz deemed were worthy of criticism. Throughout the video, iDubbbz is seen wearing a t-shirt parodying the iconic box logo of the clothing brand Supreme with the word "sheep" appearing in the logo, which is also an overt critique on the hypebeast/streetwear culture that RiceGum participates in because he is known to wear hyped clothing brands, like Supreme and Louis Vuitton, in his videos.

At the end of the video, a song by iDubbbz and fellow YouTube personality Boyinaband was played, titled "Asian Jake Paul". The song's lyrics contain verses in which the two YouTube personalities mock RiceGum, by referencing many of his previous controversies and by calling him dumb, talentless, a "borderline sex offender" and other insults. Boyinaband also filmed a video on his YouTube channel showing the production process. The same day, iDubbbz uploaded the song's music video on his alternate YouTube channel, iDubbbzTV2.

Music video
The music video for "Asian Jake Paul" was primarily filmed in Brighton, England and was released on October 3, 2017, on iDubbbzTV2 and features cameos from YouTubers, including PewDiePie, Ethan Klein of h3h3Productions, Jack Douglass, Erik Hoffstad of Internet Comment Etiquette, and HowToBasic. Some of the participants in the music video are shown wearing white hoodies with the same mock Supreme logo that was featured in the original Content Cop video. As of December 2022, the video has surpassed 85 million views.

Track listing

Charts

Release history

Notes

See also

List of diss tracks § YouTube

References

2017 singles
2017 songs
Diss tracks
2017 YouTube videos